Tseel is a sum (district) of Govi-Altai Province in western Mongolia. In 2009, its population was 2,038.

Mining 
 Tayan Nuur mine, an open-pit iron ore mining project

References 

Populated places in Mongolia
Districts of Govi-Altai Province